Return of the Chinese Boxer is a 1977 sequel to the 1970 Hong Kong film The Chinese Boxer and is directed by and starring Jimmy Wang Yu.

Plot
Since the time of the Ming period, A Chinese boxer returns to take revenge on a gang of Japanese ninjitsu experts.
a japanese man has a new weapon of a six holed rifle to kill chinese mings and qing martial artist.

Cast
 Jimmy Wang Yu as Tsao Pai Leung
 Lung Fei as Black Crane
 Hsieh Han as Kitsu
 Emily Cheung Ying Chan as Female Ninja
 Philip Ko as Chen Liu
 Jack Long as Kun Pan So
 Blackie Ko as Thai Fighter
 Yeung Fui Yuk as Nagata
 Kam Kong as Monk Yen Feng
 Wang Yung Hsing as Flying Dagger
 Hsieh Hsing as Kin Po
 Sun Jung Chi as Chao Hsao Lung
 Lei Chun as Colonel Wei
 Ching Chi Min as Lady Fong
 Ma Chi as General To
 Chen Ti Men as Japanese Lord

References

External links

1977 films
1977 martial arts films
Hong Kong martial arts films
1970s Mandarin-language films
Hong Kong films about revenge
Hong Kong sequel films
Kung fu films
Shaw Brothers Studio films
Martial arts tournament films
1970s Hong Kong films